Wang Guofa (born 1 August 1960) is a Chinese engineer who is a researcher at the China Coal Technology Engineering Group, and an academician of the Chinese Academy of Engineering.

Biography
Wang was born in Wendeng County (now Wendeng District of Weihai), Shandong, on 1 August 1960. His father worked in a state owned aquatic products company and his mother was a farmer. He secondary studied at the High School of Xiaoguan People's Commune. After resuming the college entrance examination, in 1978, he enrolled at Shandong Institute of Technology (now Shandong University), majoring in the Mechanical Department. He went on to receive his master's degree from Northeast Institute of Technology (now Northeastern University) in 1985.

He entered the workforce in January 1982, and joined the Communist Party of China in July 1996. After graduating, in  December 1985, he was despatched to the Beijing Mining Research Institute, China Coal Research Institute, becoming senior engineer in 1991.
He is now a researcher at the China Coal Technology Engineering Group.

Honours and awards
 2012 State Science and Technology Progress Award (Second Class)
 2013 State Science and Technology Progress Award (Second Class)
 2014 State Science and Technology Progress Award (First Class)
 27 November 2017 Member of the Chinese Academy of Engineering (CAE)

References

1960 births
Living people
People from Weihai
Engineers from Shandong
Shandong University alumni
Northeastern University (China) alumni
Members of the Chinese Academy of Engineering